Count of Boulogne was a historical title in the Kingdom of France. The city of Boulogne-sur-Mer became the centre of the county of Boulogne during the ninth century. Little is known of the early counts, but the first holder of the title is recorded in the 11th century.

Eustace II of Boulogne accompanied William I of England (the Conqueror) during the Norman Conquest in 1066 and fought on his side at the Battle of Hastings. His son, Eustace III, was a major participant in the First Crusade with his younger brothers, Geoffrey and Baldwin (who later became king of Jerusalem). After Baldwin's death the throne was offered to Eustace, who was reluctant and declined; the throne was then offered to Geoffrey. Afonso (also King of Portugal) 1235-1253 from Dammartin became Count of Boulogne.

Count Renaud of Boulogne obtained the title by abducting and marrying Countess Ida in 1190, and later gained title to Dammartin and Aumale. An early friend of King Philippe II Augustus, he turned against the king by joining the forces of the Holy Roman Empire at the Battle of Bouvines in 1214 (where he was defeated, captured, imprisoned and committed suicide).

Boulogne came under nominal royal control in 1223, when it passed to Philippe Hurepel ("spiked hair", the son of Philippe II). Hurepel participated in the Albigensian Crusade in 1226 and later revolted in 1229 against Blanche of Castile. He was slain by Count Dietrich V of Cleaves in 1234, according to sources, after accidentally killing Count Florent IV of Holland in a tournament. The county reverted to the crown and was passed to Adelaide of Brabant, wife of William III of Auvergne.

Boulogne was attacked and besieged a number of times during the Hundred Years' War, repeatedly passing between the English and French. In 1477 Bertrand VI of La Tour gave the county to Louis XI, who incorporated the county into France. Boulogne remained part of France, except for a brief period of English rule under Henry VIII.

William I of Blois (c. 1137 – 11 October 1159) was Count of Boulogne (1153–1159) and Earl of Surrey jure uxoris (1153–1159). He was the third son of King Stephen of England and Countess Matilda I of Boulogne.

List of counts

Uncertain
 ?–882? : Hernequin
 ?–?: Odakar V (the Great)
 ?–?: Inglebert I
 ?–?: Odakar VI
 ?–?: Arnoul II

House of Flanders

 896–918: Baldwin I (also count of Flanders)
 918–933: Adelolf (son)
 933–964: Arnulf I (brother; also count of Flanders)
 964–971: Arnulf II (nephew; son of Adelolf)
 971–990: Arnulf III (son)
 990–1025: Baldwin II (son)
 1025–1049: Eustace I (son)
 1049–1087: Eustace II (son)
 1087–1125: Eustace III (son)
 1125–1151: Matilda I (daughter)

House of Blois

 1125-1151: Stephen (husband; also Count of Mortain, Duke of Normandy and King of England)
 1151–1153: Eustace IV (son; also Count of Mortain)
 1153–1159: William I (brother; also Count of Mortain and Earl of Surrey)
 1159–1170: Mary I (sister; married Matthew of Alsace)

House of Alsace

 1170–1173: Matthew
 1173–1216: Ida (daughter)
 1181–1182: Gerard (first husband)
 1183–1186: Berthold (second husband)
 1191–1216: Renaud of Dammartin (third husband)

House of Dammartin

 1216–1260: Matilda II (also Queen of Portugal, Countess of Mortain, Countess of Aumale and Countess of Dammartin)
 1223–1235: Philip I (also Count of Clermont-en-Beauvaisis)
 1235–1253: Afonso (also King of Portugal)

House of Auvergne

 1260–1261: Adelaide (cousin; married William III, Count of Auvergne)
 1261–1277: Robert I (son; also Count of Auvergne)
 1277–1314: Robert II (son; also Count of Auvergne)
 1314–1325: Robert III (son; also Count of Auvergne)
 1325–1332: William II (son; also Count of Auvergne)
 1332–1360: Joanna I (daughter; also Countess of Auvergne); married:
 1338–1346: Philip of Burgundy
 1350–1360: John II of France

House of Burgundy

 1360–1361: Philip III (son; also Duke of Burgundy, Count of Auvergne, Count of Artois and Count of Franche-Comté)

House of Auvergne
 1361–1386: John II (cousin; also Count of Auvergne)
 1386–1404: John III (son; also Count of Auvergne)
 1404–1424: Joanna II (daughter; also Countess of Auvergne); married:
 1404–1416: John IV (also Duke of Berry)
 1416–1424: George
 1424–1437: Mary II (cousin; also Countess of Auvergne)

House of La Tour d'Auvergne

 1437–1461: Bertrand I (son; also Count of Auvergne)
 1461–1497: Bertrand II (son; also Count of Auvergne)
 1497–1501: John V (son; also Count of Auvergne)

After the death of John V, the County of Boulogne was integrated into the royal domain.

See also
Sieges of Boulogne (1544–1546)

References

Counts of Boulogne
Boulogne
Boulogne

be:Графства Булонь
bg:Булон (графство)
ca:Comtat de Boulogne
de:Grafschaft Boulogne
es:Condado de Boulogne
eo:Boulogne (graflando)
fr:Comté de Boulogne
id:Pangeran Boulogne
it:Contea di Boulogne
nl:Graafschap Boulogne
pl:Władcy Boulogne
pt:Condado de Bolonha
ru:Булонь (графство)